Patrick Mofokeng (born 15 June 1969) is a South African actor. He is best known for his roles in the films Invictus, Who Am I? and Master Harold...and the Boys.

Personal life
He was born on 15 June 1969 in Cape Town, South Africa. He later moved to Johannesburg. But after few years, he resettled in Cape Town. He completed a Diploma in Drama and Speech from CAP Arts School in Cape Town.

Career
In 1997 he made acting debut with the TV movie Pride of Africa. In 1998, he appeared in Jackie Chan's film Who Am I where he played a minor role as 'Village Hunter'. In 2008 he acted in the film Surprise and played the role of 'Gerald Judge'. Meanwhile, he won the Golden Horn Award for the Best Actor in a TV Drama for his role in The Provider in 2007. He also won the award for the Best TV drama for the serial When we were black.

In 2005, he played the role 'King Sibiya' in the television drama Zone 14. The role became highly popular. Apart from that, he played guest appearances in the television serials Backstage and Yizo Yizo, Scandal!, and Isidingo. In the popular serial Scandal!, he played the role 'Mlungisi Ngema'. He also starred in the second film The Good Provider in 2006, where he played the leading role of 'Solomon Sithole'. In 2011, he played the supportive role of 'Jimmy' in the eleventh season of the SABC1 AIDS drama series Soul City. In 2020, he starred in the South African Netflix original series Blood & Water.

Filmography

References

External links
 

Living people
South African people of Indian descent
South African male film actors
South African male television actors
People from Cape Town
1969 births